Peter Ax (March 29, 1927 – May 2, 2013) was a German zoologist. His main work concerned the investigation of interstitial fauna and the exposition of a phylogenetic system for the animals.

Biography 
Peter Ax attended the Oberschule für Jungen in Hamburg until 1944 and subsequently completed his military service. He studied biology at the University of Kiel from 1946, and graduated with a doctorate in 1950. From 1952 to 1961, he was employed as a scientific worker at the same university. He gained his habilitation in 1955, and worked as a Dozent. In 1961, he went to the University of Göttingen, where he held the chair in Morphology and Systematic Zoology.  He remained there until his retirement as an emeritus professor in 1992.

Research 
Peter Ax worked primarily on the micro- and meiofauna of the interstitial environment in marine sediments, and on the systematics of flatworms. He described an array of hitherto unknown species from this environment, including Diplosoma micans, the first tunicate to be found in the interstitial habitat, in 1970. In 1956 he was the first to describe the Gnathostomulida, which was also found from this habitat. Through his works such as Das phylogenetische System (1984) and the three-volume Das System der Metazoa (1995-2001), he also became known as one of the important exponents of phylogenetic systematics in Germany.

Memberships and awards 
Peter Ax was the founding editor of the journal Mikrofauna marina. He worked as a guest scientist at the Friday Harbor Laboratories of the University of Washington, at the marine biological stations in Arcachon, Banyuls-sur-Mer, and Naples, and at the Darwin Station on the Galapagos Islands.

He was a member of the Akademie der Wissenschaften und der Literatur in Mainz, a fellow at the Institute for Advanced Study, Berlin in 1986/87, and an honorary member of the Gesellschaft für Biologische Systematik.

Selected works available in English 
 The phylogenetic system: The systematization of organisms on the basis of their phylogenies. (Original: das phylogenetische System) Chicester: Wiley, 1987.
 Multicellular animals: The phylogenetic system of the Metazoa (Original: Das System der Metazoa) Berlin: Springer, 1996-2003. (3 vols.)

References 

Evolutionary biologists
2013 deaths
1927 births
20th-century German zoologists
Members of the Göttingen Academy of Sciences and Humanities